Dorothy is an unincorporated community in Raleigh County, West Virginia, United States. Dorothy has a post office with ZIP code 25060. At one time, it was also called Lawson.

References

Unincorporated communities in Raleigh County, West Virginia
Unincorporated communities in West Virginia
Coal towns in West Virginia